Tumbao is a barrio in the municipality of Maunabo, Puerto Rico. Its population in 2010 was 593. A new barrio, appearing in the 2010 census, Tumbao barrio was formed from part of Palo Seco barrio.

See also

 List of communities in Puerto Rico

References

Barrios of Maunabo, Puerto Rico